This is a list of some of the military equipment used by the paramilitary wing of Hezbollah.

Small arms

Assault and battle rifles

Sniper rifles

Machine guns

Heavy weapons and missiles

Anti-tank 

Hezbollah has apparently thousands of anti-tank guided missiles in total. The group has received many unreported weapon shipments from both Iran and Syria.

Anti-aircraft

Rockets, missiles and launchers 

Anti-ship

Vehicles

Tanks, armoured personnel carriers, infantry fighting vehicles and misc 

Unmanned aerial vehicles

The group claims to build their own unmanned aerial vehicles, which is disputed, but in any case the designs are copies of Iranian models.

See also
 Lebanese Ground Forces Equipment
 Lebanese Armed Forces Out of Service Equipment
 Lebanese Civil War
 Lebanese Air Force aircraft inventory
 List of military equipment of Islamic State
 List of military equipment used by Syrian Democratic Forces
 List of military equipment used by Syrian opposition forces 
 Syrian intervention in Lebanon
 Weapons of the Lebanese Civil War
 1958 Lebanon crisis
 1982 Lebanon War

References 

Military equipment of Syria
Hezbollah
Hezbollah